The Mid-South Conference (MSC) is an athletic conference affiliated with the MHSAA. All schools are Class D (small school). Members are located in Michigan.

Full members

Note: enrollments taken from 2020-21 MHSAA enrollment listing (grades 9-12)

Past members 

*It is currently unclear if Holt Lutheran is in the conference due to major staff changes and low enrollment in their athletic programs, because of this they haven't been able to fully participate in most varsity sports.

Sports
The Mid South Conference competes in boys and girls soccer and basketball and girls volleyball.  In 2015, teams competed in an inaugural conference cross country meet.

References

External links
 http://www.marshallacademy.org/
 http://www.willcarletonacademy.com/
 https://web.archive.org/web/20120322144413/http://holtlutheran.org/hls/
 http://www.nccswarriors.org/
 http://www.steinerschool.org/
 http://www.calhounchristian.org/

Sports in Michigan
Michigan high school sports conferences